Shalosh is the third album by guitarist Jon Madof's Rashanim trio, with Shanir Ezra Blumenkranz on bass guitar and Mathias Kunzli on drums. The album was released in 2006 by Tzadik as part of the Radical Jewish Culture Series.

Reception

All About Jazz reviewer Troy Collins said "Rashanim veers far and wide, covering a range of styles and moods. One of the year's most entertaining releases, rich with memorable melodies and haunting themes, Shalosh is not to be missed." AllMusic rated the album 4 stars out of 5.

Track listing 
All compositions by Jon Madof
 "Ein Gedi" - 4:31 		
 "Yosefa" - 5:33 		
 "Atbash" - 4:52 		
 "Da'at" - 5:27 		
 "Cracow Niggun" - 5:49 		
 "Kavanah" - 5:46 		
 "Jacob and Esau" - 2:24
 "Jerusalem" - 5:11 		
 "Ur Ur Lauter Georg" - 7:43 		
 "Ar Aare" - 4:23

Personnel 
 Jon Madof – guitar 
 Shanir Ezra Blumenkranz – double bass, electric bass, oud, gimbri
 Matthias Künzli – drums, percussion

References 

2006 albums
Tzadik Records albums
Jon Madof albums